† Acroreiidae is an extinct family of air-breathing snails, pulmonate gastropod mollusks in the superfamily Siphonariidae. The living siphonariids are all marine pulmonates, false sea limpets that breathe air.

Taxonomy 
The family Acroreiidae is classified in the informal group, Basommatophora (according to the taxonomy of the Gastropoda by Bouchet & Rocroi, 2005).

Acroreiidae has no subfamilies.

Genera 
The type genus is Acroreia Cossmann, 1885

References